Madison Post (January 22, 1815 – September 10, 1867)
was the fifth mayor of Tampa, Florida and the father of Duff Post, who was himself mayor of Tampa for several years during two nonconsecutive periods in office. Madison Post was mayor from February 10, 1858 until February 12, 1859.

Post was born in New Jersey and moved to Tampa in 1849, a year after the great hurricane of 1848 destroyed much of Tampa. He worked as the manager of the Tampa Hotel and eventually purchased a general store on Lafayette Street (now Kennedy Boulevard).

Post was a member of the "Know-Nothings" and a supporter of slavery. Post was also anti-immigration and anti-Catholic in his politics. He was appointed as Receiver of Public Moneys for Hillsborough County in 1854. He joined Dr. Darwin Branch and Edward Clarke as delegates to the American Party's Presidential Convention which nominated former President Millard Fillmore.

Post and the council increased license fees and established new ordinances to re-establish  Tampa's finances. Post enlisted as a private in the Confederate Infantry during the U.S. Civil War and served as a Confederate Deputy Marshall in Florida and as a tax assessor for Florida's Confederate government.

Madison Post died in Tampa on September 10, 1867.

References

Further reading
 Covington, Dr. James W. and Wavering, Debbie Lee, "The Mayors of Tampa: A Brief Administrative History," Tampa, FL: University of Tampa, 1987.
Grismer, Karl H., Tampa: A History of the City and the Tampa Bay Region of Florida, St. Petersburg Printing Company, FL, 1950.
Robinson, Ernest L., History of Hillsborough County, Florida: Narrative and Biographical, The Record Company, St. Augustine, FL, 1928.
Tampa Council Minutes, City of Tampa Archives, Tampa, FL
January 1, 1857 - October 2, 1891 Microfilm Roll # 1

Mayors of Tampa, Florida
1815 births
1867 deaths
19th-century American politicians